This is a list of the 129 National Register of Historic Places listings in Cook County, Illinois outside Chicago and Evanston. Separate lists are provided for the 62 listed properties and historic districts in Evanston and the more than 350 listed properties and districts in Chicago. The Chicago Sanitary and Ship Canal Historic District extends through the West Side of Chicago, DuPage County and Will County to Lockport.

Current listings

Chicago

Evanston

Other parts of Cook County

|}

Former listing

|}

Key

See also

List of Chicago Landmarks
National Register of Historic Places listings in Chicago
National Register of Historic Places listings in Illinois
List of National Historic Landmarks in Illinois

References

External links
NPS Focus database, National Park Service.

 
Cook